Phintella abnormis is a spider species of the family Salticidae (jumping spiders).

Distribution
This species is seen in Primorsky Krai (written as primore in original text) of Russia, Korean peninsula, Japan,, Mainland China and Taiwan.。

The type locality of the species is in Japan.

References

External links

Salticidae
Spiders of Asia
Taxa named by Embrik Strand
Spiders described in 1906